The Château de Petit-Bois is a 19th-century mansion in Cosne-d'Allier in the Allier department in the Auvergne region of France.

The château was noted for the design of the park, which by the use of an artificial channel and a screen of trees, gave it the appearance of standing on an island. Its former grounds have been destroyed, however.

Summed up and translated from the equivalent article at French Wikipédia, 6 November 2007

Houses completed in the 19th century
Châteaux in Allier
19th-century architecture in France